Hugh Grosvenor may refer to:

Hugh Grosvenor, 1st Duke of Westminster (1825–1899)
Hugh Grosvenor, 2nd Duke of Westminster (1879–1953)
Hugh Grosvenor, 2nd Baron Stalbridge, Baron Stalbridge
Hugh William Grosvenor (1884–1914), son of Hugh Grosvenor, 1st Duke of Westminster
Hugh Grosvenor, 7th Duke of Westminster (born 1991), son of Gerald Grosvenor, 6th Duke of Westminster